The 2019 Reyhanlı car bombing was a car bombing attack that occurred on 5 July 2019 in the city of Reyhanlı in Hatay Province, Turkey. The blast killed at least three people from Syria.

Bombing
The bombing occurred in a car in the Hatay Province near the border with Syria. The car was carrying citizens from Syria.

Victims
The three victims were Syrian citizens who were inside the car that exploded.

See also
2013 Reyhanlı car bombings
List of terrorist incidents in July 2019

References

2019 murders in Turkey
Car and truck bombings in Turkey
Improvised explosive device bombings in 2019
History of Hatay Province
July 2019 crimes in Asia
Syrian people murdered abroad
Terrorist incidents in Turkey in 2019